Nemapogon clematella, the barred white clothes moth, is a moth of the family Tineidae.  It is found in most of Europe and in North America, where it has been recorded from Maryland and North Carolina. The habitat consists of woodlands.

The wingspan is 12–15 mm. Adults are on wing from June to August.

The larvae feed on fungi, including Hypoxylon fuscum and Fomes fomentarius, growing under the bark of dead twigs of elm, oak, beech and hawthorn. The species overwinters in the larval stage. Pupation takes places in the fungus or wood.

References

External links
 
 Nemapogon clematella at ukmoths

Nemapogoninae
Moths described in 1781
Moths of Europe
Moths of North America
Taxa named by Johan Christian Fabricius